Michael Howard Harris (born 1954) is an American mathematician and professor of mathematics at Columbia University who specializes in number theory and representation theory. He made notable contributions to the Langlands program, for which he (alongside Richard Taylor) won the 2007 Clay Research Award. In particular, he (jointly with Taylor) proved the local Langlands conjecture for GL(n) over a p-adic local field , and he was part of the team that proved the Sato–Tate conjecture. He was elected a member of the National Academy of Sciences in 2022.

Education and career
Harris attained his doctorate from Harvard University in 1977, under supervision of Barry Mazur. His thesis, entitled "On p-Adic Representations Arising from Descent on Abelian Varieties", was later published in Compositio Mathematica.  Before arriving at Columbia University he held permanent positions at Brandeis University and Université Paris-Diderot; he has also held extended visiting positions at Bethlehem University, the Steklov Institute of Mathematics, and the Institut des Hautes-Études Scientifiques.

Works

Recognition
He was included in the 2019 class of fellows of the American Mathematical Society "for contributions to arithmetic geometry, particularly the theory of automorphic forms, L-functions and motives".  He was elected to the Academia Europaea in 2016 and to the American Academy of Arts and Sciences in 2019.

Notes

References

External links

Michael Harris's web page

1954 births
Living people
20th-century American mathematicians
21st-century American mathematicians
Number theorists
Harvard Graduate School of Arts and Sciences alumni
Clay Research Award recipients
Institute for Advanced Study visiting scholars
Columbia University faculty
Fellows of the American Mathematical Society
People from Philadelphia
Members of the United States National Academy of Sciences